Oregon Route 206 is an Oregon state highway located in the north-central part of the state. It runs from Interstate 84 at Celilo Village to a junction with Oregon Route 74 and Oregon Route 207 in Heppner. Aside from Interstate 84, Oregon Route 206 is the main east–west highway in Gilliam County and provides access from the Portland metropolitan area to the John Day area. The highway is known as the Wasco-Heppner Highway No. 300 (see Oregon highways and routes), except for the section between Celilo Village and Wasco,  which is called the Celilo-Wasco Highway No. 301.

Major intersections

References

206
Transportation in Wasco County, Oregon
Transportation in Gilliam County, Oregon
Transportation in Sherman County, Oregon
Transportation in Morrow County, Oregon
Heppner, Oregon